Peter Currie was a Scottish professional footballer who played as an outside left.

Career
Currie played for Armadale, Bradford City, Dumbarton and Broxburn. For Bradford City he made 17 appearances in the Football League, scoring 2 goals.

Sources

References

Year of birth missing
Year of death missing
Scottish footballers
Armadale F.C. players
Bradford City A.F.C. players
Dumbarton F.C. players
English Football League players
Association football outside forwards